Washabo Airstrip  is an airstrip near Washabo or Wasjabo and Apoera or Apura in Suriname.

Charters and destinations
Airlines serving charters to this airport are:

See also

 List of airports in Suriname
 Transport in Suriname

References

External links
Washabo Airport
OurAirports - Washabo
OpenStreetMap - Washabo

Airports in Suriname
Sipaliwini District